Samuel Grayson Wilson (born 1949) is a former United States district judge of the United States District Court for the Western District of Virginia.

Education and career

Born in Norfolk, Virginia, Wilson received a Bachelor of Arts degree from the University of Richmond in 1971 and a Juris Doctor from Wake Forest University School of Law in 1974. He was an assistant commonwealth's attorney of Roanoke, Virginia from 1974 to 1976, and was an Assistant United States Attorney of the Western District of Virginia in 1976. He was a United States magistrate judge of the Western District of Virginia from 1976 to 1981, returning to private practice in Roanoke, Virginia from 1981 to 1990.

Federal judicial service

On March 6, 1990, Wilson was nominated by President George H. W. Bush to a seat on the United States District Court for the Western District of Virginia vacated by Judge Glen Morgan Williams. Wilson was confirmed by the United States Senate on May 11, 1990, and received his commission on May 14, 1990. He served as Chief Judge from 1997 to 2004. Wilson retired from the federal bench effective July 31, 2014.

References

Sources
FJC Bio

1949 births
Living people
People from Norfolk, Virginia
Assistant United States Attorneys
Judges of the United States District Court for the Western District of Virginia
United States district court judges appointed by George H. W. Bush
20th-century American judges
United States magistrate judges
University of Richmond alumni
Wake Forest University School of Law alumni